The Sparkassen Giro Bochum is a road bicycle race which is annually held for both men's and women's around an urban circuit in the German city of Bochum, Germany. Since 2005 the men's race is  part of the UCI Europe Tour, being organised as 1.1 race.

Men's winners

Women's winners 
From 2004 through to 2011 the event ran as a UCI 1.1 (old UCI rating of 1.9.2 in 2004), becoming a national event in 2012. In 2013 the event returned as a 1.1 rated event, being upgraded to UCI Women's World Cup (CDM) rating for the 2014 and 2015 seasons. For 2016 and 2017, the event again ran as a national event.

External links

 
 
 

 
UCI Europe Tour races
Cycle races in Germany
Recurring sporting events established in 1998
1998 establishments in Germany
Sport in Bochum
Sport in North Rhine-Westphalia
Women's road bicycle races